Zengcheng Square station, is a station of  Line 21 of the Guangzhou Metro. This is also the terminus of Line 21. It started operations on 28 December 2018.

The station has an underground island platform. Platform 1 is for terminating trains, whilst platform 2 is for originating trains to Yuancun.

Station layout

Exits
There are 6 exits, lettered A, B, C, D, E and F. Exit E is accessible. Exits A and B are located on Lixin Highway, exits C and F are located on Zengcheng Avenue and exit E is located on Lijin Avenue.

References

Railway stations in China opened in 2018
Guangzhou Metro stations in Zengcheng District